Rauf Sahraman oğlu Aliyev (born 12 February 1989) is an Azerbaijani international footballer who plays as a striker for Azerbaijani club Kapaz. He made his national debut in an away friendly match against Jordan on 25 February 2010.

Club career
In August 2017, Aliyev signed for Kukësi.

On 28 March 2018, Gabala FK announced the signing of Aliyev on a contract until the summer of 2019.

On 10 June 2019, Aliyev signed one-year contract with Neftçi PFK. On 8 January 2020, Aliyev was released by Neftçi, going on to sign for Sabail on 11 January 2020

Career statistics

Club

International

Honours

Club
Qarabağ
Azerbaijan Cup: 2008–09

Gabala
Azerbaijan Cup: 2018–19

Individual
Azerbaijani Footballer of the Year: 2011
APL Best Forward: 2011–12
Azerbaijan Premier League Top Scorer (1): 2016–17

References

External links
 
 
 
 

1989 births
Living people
Azerbaijani footballers
People from Füzuli
Association football forwards
Qarabağ FK players
FC Baku players
Khazar Lankaran FK players
Neftçi PFK players
Shamakhi FK players
FK Kukësi players
Gabala FC players
Sabail FK players
Azerbaijan Premier League players
Kategoria Superiore players
Azerbaijan youth international footballers
Azerbaijan under-21 international footballers
Azerbaijan international footballers
Azerbaijani expatriate footballers
Expatriate footballers in Albania
Azerbaijani expatriate sportspeople in Albania